CBX5 may refer to:
Tungsten (Cantung) Airport
CBX5 (gene) (chromobox homolog 5), a chromatin protein.